Pleurodeles is a genus of three species, the ribbed newts:

The Iberian ribbed newt is the most common of the three species, and the most frequently used as a model organism by scientists. However, its numbers in the wild are declining, and in 2006 it became a near threatened species. The other two species are in fact threatened, with P. nebulosus considered vulnerable to extinction and P. poireti classified as an endangered species. The numbers of all three species are declining in the wild. Livestock agriculture is an ongoing major cause of habitat loss and degradation, and of water pollution, for all three species.

References

Newts
Amphibian genera
Taxa named by Karl Michahelles